Joan Burton (born 1 February 1949) is a former Irish Labour Party politician who served as Tánaiste and Leader of the Labour Party from 2014 to 2016, Minister for Social Protection from 2011 to 2016, Deputy Leader of the Labour Party from 2007 to 2014, Minister of State at the Department of Foreign Affairs from 1994 to 1997 and Minister of State at the Department of Social Welfare from 1993 to 1994. She served as a Teachta Dála (TD) for the Dublin West constituency from 1992 to 1997 and 2002 to 2020.

Burton was first elected to Dáil Éireann at the 1992 general election. From 1995 to 1997, she was Minister of State at the Department of Foreign Affairs. She lost her seat at the 1997 general election, but was re-elected to the Dáil at the 2002 general election. She was deputy leader of the Labour Party under Eamon Gilmore, between 2007 and 2014. She was Tánaiste (Deputy Prime Minister) from 2014 to 2016 and Minister for Social Protection from 2011 to 2016. She resigned as Labour Party leader in May 2016, following heavy losses by the party in the 2016 general election. Burton lost her seat in the 2020 general election on the 5th count.

Early life

Burton is a native of the Stoneybatter area of Dublin. She was adopted by the Burton family as a baby and was brought up in Inchicore. Her adoptive father worked in the local iron foundry. She was educated at St. Gabriel's NS, Cowper Street and St. Joseph Sisters of Charity Secondary School, Stanhope Street and University College Dublin (UCD), where she graduated with a degree in commerce. She is also a fellow of the Institute of Chartered Accountants. She has worked as a lecturer in Accountancy in the Dublin Institute of Technology and the University of Dar es Salaam, Tanzania.

Political career

Early years: 1989–1997
Burton first stood for election at the 1989 general election, as one of two Labour Party candidates in the Dublin Central constituency; she failed to be elected. At the local elections in 1991, she was elected to Dublin County Council for the Mulhuddart local electoral area.

Burton was first elected to Dáil Éireann at the 1992 general election as a Labour Party TD for the Dublin West constituency in the 27th Dáil. She was appointed Minister of State at the Department of Social Welfare in the Fianna Fáil–Labour Party coalition that was formed after that election. With the breakdown of that coalition and the establishment of a Rainbow Coalition of Fine Gael-Labour-Democratic Left in early 1995, she became Minister of State at the Department of Foreign Affairs, a position she held until the coalition's defeat at the 1997 general election.

Loss of seat and re-election: 1997–2007
She lost her seat at the 1997 general election, to Joe Higgins of the Socialist Party. Burton was re-elected to Fingal County Council in the 1999 local elections, on this occasion winning a seat in the Castleknock local electoral area. She was re-elected to the Dáil for Dublin West at the 2002 general election. She was then appointed Labour Party Spokesperson for Finance. She was a candidate for the deputy leadership of the party in 2002, obtaining 24% of the first preference vote, but was unsuccessful.

Labour Deputy Leadership: 2007–2014
Burton became deputy leader of the Labour Party in September 2007. She was re-elected to represent Dublin West at the 2011 general election, topping the poll on the 1st count with 9,627 votes, and was the first TD in the country to be elected to the 31st Dáil.

Labour Leadership: 2014–2016
Labour polled badly at the 2014 local and European elections; this led to the resignation of Eamon Gilmore as leader. Burton announced her candidacy for the leadership to replace him. On 4 July 2014, she won the leadership election, defeating Alex White by 78% to 22%. Taoiseach Enda Kenny, appointed her as Tánaiste on the same day. Upon her election she said that the Labour Party "would focus on social repair, and govern more with the heart". She became the first woman to lead the Labour Party.

On 11 July 2014, Burton announced the Labour Party cabinet ministers, with party deputy leader Alan Kelly appointed as Minister for the Environment, Alex White as Minister for Communications, Energy and Natural Resources, Jan O'Sullivan as Minister for Education and Skills and Gerald Nash as Minister of State for Business and Employment and Brendan Howlin remaining as Minister for Public Expenditure and Reform. Burton also remained in her ministry at the Department of Social Protection. During her term as leader and Tánaiste, her contribution was key to preventing the sell-off of State assets, protecting core welfare payments and increasing the minimum wage twice.

Despite a Millward Browne poll that predicted she would lose her constituency seat a month prior to the 2016 general election, Burton polled better than expected and retained her Dublin West seat.

At the Women in Media conference that took place in April 2016, following elections and during negotiations to form a governing coalition, Burton discussed how women were excluded from the government negotiation process. She criticized what she called the misogyny and abuse female politicians faced during the election, and as well as the "vulgar, crude, and demeaning" Late Late Show broadcast during the election that offered Freudian interpretations of politicians' body language.

The Labour Party returned to opposition following the 2016 general election, in greatly reduced numbers. Burton remained as Tánaiste and Minister for Social Protection in an acting capacity during prolonged talks on government formation. On 6 May 2016, Enda Kenny announced in the Dáil that Frances Fitzgerald would be the new Tánaiste, while Burton's constituency colleague Leo Varadkar took her old job in the Department of Social Protection.

On 10 May 2016, she announced her resignation as Labour Party leader, which took effect on 20 May 2016, when her replacement Brendan Howlin was chosen unopposed.

She lost her seat at the 2020 Irish general election, with her first preference vote declining from 15.4% to 4.8%.

References

External links

Joan Burton's page on the Labour Party website

1949 births
Living people
Alumni of University College Dublin
Councillors of Dublin County Council
Women government ministers of the Republic of Ireland
Labour Party (Ireland) TDs
Leaders of the Labour Party (Ireland)
Local councillors in Fingal
Members of the 27th Dáil
Members of the 29th Dáil
Members of the 30th Dáil
Members of the 31st Dáil
Members of the 32nd Dáil
Ministers for Social Affairs (Ireland)
Ministers of State of the 27th Dáil
Politicians from Fingal
Tánaistí
Women ministers of state of the Republic of Ireland
20th-century women Teachtaí Dála
21st-century women Teachtaí Dála